North Duffield is a village and civil parish in the Selby District of North Yorkshire, England. It was historically part of the East Riding of Yorkshire until 1974. The River Derwent forms the eastern boundary of the parish.
There are approximately 1,800 residents in the village, the majority of whom are aged between 30 and 50 years. The population at the 2011 Census was 1,317.

Overview
North Duffield is home to a Community Primary School, Methodist Church, village hall, village green, hairdressers, garage, the black cat rescue, park, shop, pub, Duck pond, many fields, and a bowls club.

There is an active North Duffield Conservation and local History Society, which in 2011 was funded by Lottery Funding.
North Duffield has its own village football team, North Duffield Dragons, for children aged between 3 and 16.
 
Menthorpe Gate railway station on the Selby to Driffield Line served the village from 1853 to 1953.

Governance
An electoral ward in the same name exists. This ward stretches north-east to Thorganby with a total population taken at the 2011 Census of 1,913.

References

External links

Villages in North Yorkshire
Civil parishes in North Yorkshire